Envy/Jesu is a split EP between Japanese hardcore band Envy and Justin Broadrick's Jesu. It was originally released in Japan by Daymare in 2008. Conspiracy Records released a 12" vinyl version, limited to 2,000 copies in white, transparent blue, gold and silver.

Hydra Head Records re-released the album in North America on July 26, 2009. Hydra Head also released a double 10" vinyl edition in September, 2009.

The album artwork was designed by Aaron Turner.

Track listing
Side A
Envy – "Conclusion of Existence" (5:58)
Envy – "A Winter Quest for Fantasy" (6:25)
Envy – "Life Caught in the Rain" (4:25)

Side B
Jesu – "Hard to Reach" (13:39)
Jesu – "The Stars That Hang Above You" (7:35)

References

2008 albums
Jesu (band) albums
Envy (band) albums
Split albums
Albums with cover art by Aaron Turner